Mel House (born December 27, 1976 in Houston, Texas) is a filmmaker best known for his features in the horror and science fiction genres.

Biography
His directorial debut was the independent film Fade to Black, which was followed by Witchcraft 13 (2007) and Closet Space (2007).

In 2007, he directed a zombie-themed music video for musician Jonah Matranga's single "Not About A Girl Or A Place".

In the Summer of 2008, House directed the science fiction/horror film Walking Distance in Houston and Galveston, Texas, prior to the city's destruction from Hurricane Ike. He appears in the Science-Fiction horror film Renfield: The Undead, directed by Bob Willems. He was a special guest of the 2010 Dallas International Film Festival.

Filmography (as director) 

Fade to Black (2001)
Witchcraft 13: Blood of the Chosen (2007)
Closet Space (2007)
Jonah Matranga in Not About A Girl Or A Place (music video) (2007)
Psychic Experiment (formally Walking Distance) (2009)

Personal life
House is married to actress Melanie Donihoo.

References

External links
Mel House at MySpace

1976 births
Living people
People from Houston
Film directors from Texas